Mohammed Rabii ( Muḥammad Rabī‘ī; born 13 July 1993) is a Moroccan boxer. He won a bronze medal in the men's welterweight event at the 2016 Summer Olympics.

Career

World Series of Boxing record

Professional career
He signed his contract with Nowhere2Hyde Management on 30 October 2016. His first match was really memorable for him on 11 March 2017 because while he was fighting with László Kovács in the Czech Republic, his wife was laboring with their son in Morocco.

Professional boxing record

|-style="text-align:center; background:#e3e3e3;"
|style="border-style:none none solid solid; "|
|style="border-style:none none solid solid; "|Result
|style="border-style:none none solid solid; "|Record
|style="border-style:none none solid solid; "|Opponent
|style="border-style:none none solid solid; "|Type
|style="border-style:none none solid solid; "|Round, time
|style="border-style:none none solid solid; "|Date
|style="border-style:none none solid solid; "|Location
|style="border-style:none none solid solid; "|Notes
|- align=center
|10
|Win
|10-0
|align=left| Jesus Gurrola
|UD
|8
|16 November 2019
|align=left|
|align=left|
|- align=center
|9
|Win
|9-0
| align=left| Rafał Jackiewicz
|UD
|8
|2 March 2019
|align=left|
|align=left|
|- align=center
|8
|Win
|8-0
| align=left| Alexandr Zhuravskiy
|UD
|8
|8 December 2018
|align=left|
|align=left|
|- align=center
|7
|Win
|7-0
| align=left| Gojko Knezevic
|
|1 (8)
|20 October 2018
|align=left|
|align=left|
|- align=center
|6
|Win
|6-0
| align=left| Anderson Clayton
|UD
|8
|15 September 2018
|align=left|
|align=left|
|- align=center
|5
|Win
|5-0
| align=left| Giuseppe Lauri
|
|3 (8)
|24 March 2018
|align=left|
|align=left|
|- align=center
|4
|Win
|4-0
| align=left| László Szilvai
|KO
|1 (6)
|2 December 2017
|align=left|
|align=left|
|- align=center
|3
|Win
|3-0
| align=left| Teimuraz Abuladze
|KO
|1 (6)
|1 July 2017
|align=left|
|align=left|
|- align=center
|2
|Win
|2-0
| align=left| Jean-Pierre Habimana
|PTS
|6
|22 April 2017
|align=left|
|align=left| 
|- align=center
|1
|Win
|1-0
| align=left| László Kovács
|
|1 (6)
|11 March 2017
|align=left|
|align=left|
|- align=center

References

External links

 
 
 Mohammed Rabii at World Series of Boxing
 
 

 

1993 births
Living people
Moroccan male boxers
Olympic boxers of Morocco
Boxers at the 2016 Summer Olympics
Place of birth missing (living people)
Medalists at the 2016 Summer Olympics
Olympic bronze medalists for Morocco
Olympic medalists in boxing
AIBA World Boxing Championships medalists
Welterweight boxers
21st-century Moroccan people